Fellows of the Royal Society who were elected in 1956.

Fellows 

Norman Percy Allen
John Baker, Baron Baker
Richard Maling Barrer
Robert Brown
John Alfred Valentine Butler
Dennis Gabor
Hans Gruneberg
Charles Skinner Hallpike
John Edward Harris
Walter Kurt Hayman
Nicholas Kemmer
Nicholas Kurti
Robert Gwyn Macfarlane
Roy Markham
John Wesley Mitchell
Sir William D.M. Paton
Sir Alfred Brian Pippard
Helen Porter
George Salt
Charles William Shoppee
Frederick William Shotton
Errol White
 Sir Maurice Wilkes
 Sir Denys Haigh Wilkinson
Arthur Wormall

Foreign members

Kaj Ulrik Linderstrøm-Lang
Hans Pettersson
Robert Burns Woodward
Frits Zernike

Royal Fellow 
Queen Elizabeth The Queen Mother

References

1956
1956 in science
1956 in the United Kingdom